Gillette Stadium is a multi-purpose stadium located in the town of Foxborough, Massachusetts, which is  southwest of downtown Boston. It serves as the home stadium and administrative offices for both the New England Patriots of the National Football League (NFL) and the New England Revolution of Major League Soccer (MLS). It opened in 2002, replacing the adjacent Foxboro Stadium. It also served as the home venue for the University of Massachusetts (UMass) Minutemen football team in 2012 and 2013, while on-campus Warren McGuirk Alumni Stadium underwent renovations; it continued to serve as a part-time home venue for higher attendance UMass games through 2018. Gillette Stadium's seating capacity is 65,878, including 5,876 club seats and 89 luxury suites.

The town of Foxborough approved plans for the stadium's construction on December 6, 1999, and work on the stadium began on March 24, 2000. The first official event at the stadium was a New England Revolution soccer game on May 11, 2002. Jeremiah Freed was the opening band at the WBCN River Rave on June 9, making them the first band to play at the stadium. Grand opening ceremonies were held on September 9, when the Patriots unveiled their Super Bowl XXXVI championship banner before a Monday Night Football game against the Pittsburgh Steelers. The stadium was originally known as CMGI Field before the naming rights were bought by Gillette after the "dot-com" bust. Although Gillette was acquired by Procter & Gamble in 2005, the stadium retains the Gillette name. In September 2010, Gillette and the Patriots announced that their partnership, which includes naming rights to the stadium, would extend through the 2031 season. Additionally, uBid (a wholly owned subsidiary of CMGI until 2003) continues to sponsor one of the main entrance gates to the stadium as of 2009.

Gillette Stadium is accessible by rail via the Providence/Stoughton and Franklin lines at the Foxboro MBTA station, but only during Patriots games and some concerts. The Patriots have sold out every home game since moving to the stadium—preseason, regular season, and playoffs. This streak dates back to the 1994 season at Foxboro Stadium; by September 2016, it had reached 231 games. The stadium is owned and operated by Kraft Sports Group, a subsidiary of the Kraft Group, the company through which businessman Robert Kraft owns the Patriots and Revolution.

The stadium is set to host several matches during the 2026 FIFA World Cup.

History

Foxboro Stadium 

From 1971 to 2001, the Patriots played all of their home games at Foxboro Stadium. The stadium was privately funded on an extremely small budget and featured few amenities. Its aluminum benches would freeze over during cold-weather games and it had an unorganized dirt parking lot.

Foxboro Stadium did not bring in the profits needed to keep an NFL team in New England; at just over 60,000 seats, it was one of the NFL's smallest stadiums.

In 1984, team executive Chuck Sullivan funded the Victory Tour of The Jacksons, in an attempt to earn more profit for the team. Tickets sales failed, however, and the team's debt increased even further – to a final total of US$126 million. After two unsuccessful owners bought the team and stadium, it was clear that a new stadium had to be built for the team to stay in New England. This is when other cities in the New England area, including Boston (which was previously home to the Patriots), Hartford, and Providence became interested in building new stadiums to lure the Patriots away from Foxborough.

Location discussions 
The first major stadium proposal from another city came in September 1993. Lowell Weicker, the Governor of Connecticut, proposed to the Connecticut General Assembly that a new stadium should be built in Hartford to attract the Patriots to move there, stating that a stadium had "potentially great benefit" if it were built. The bill passed in the State Assembly on September 27, 1993.

Back in Massachusetts, there was a proposal to build a "Megaplex" in Boston, which would be the site of the stadium, as well as a new Fenway Park (the home park of the Boston Red Sox) and a convention center. The proposed sites for this hybrid convention center-stadium were along Summer Street in South Boston or at the so-called Crosstown site along Melnea Cass Boulevard in Roxbury, adjacent to Boston's South End. The administration of Massachusetts Governor William Weld pushed for construction of a full "Megaplex" at the crosstown site, with then-new Boston Mayor Thomas Menino favoring construction of a new, stand-alone convention center in South Boston. Ultimately, the residents of neither of these neighborhoods wanted a stadium, and as a result, Menino backed out, fearing that it would affect his chance at re-election. The Fenway Park plan was cancelled after many "Save Fenway Park!" groups popped up to save the historic ballpark.

Kraft then began a plan to build a new stadium in South Boston. In that plan, Kraft was to pay for the stadium himself, hoping to win the support of Weld and Menino. He began to sketch designs, but the project was leaked to the press in December 1996. The residents of South Boston objected to a stadium being built in that location, causing Menino and Weld to become angry at Kraft. Kraft abandoned all plans for a Boston Stadium after the affair. In January 1997, Kraft began talks with Providence mayor Vincent Cianci to relocate the team to Providence and build a new stadium there. The proposed 68,000-seat domed stadium would have cost $250 million, and would have been paid through income taxes, public bonds, surcharges on tickets, and private funds. Residents of the neighborhood of the proposed project were extremely opposed to the project because the surrounding area would have needed massive infrastructure improvements. The proposal fell through after a few weeks.

During a news conference in September 1998, the team revealed plans to build a new stadium in Foxborough, keeping the team in Massachusetts. It was to be funded by the state as well as Kraft himself. This plan brought more competition from Connecticut, as a $1 billion plan to renovate an area of Hartford, including building a stadium. Kraft then signed an agreement to move the team to Hartford on November 18, 1998. The proposed stadium included 68,000 seats, 60 luxury boxes, and had a projected cost of $375 million. As before in Boston and Providence, construction of the stadium was challenged by the residents. Problems with the site were discovered, and an agreement could not be reached regarding the details of the stadium. The entire plan eventually fell through, enraging then Connecticut governor John G. Rowland, who lobbied hard for the stadium and spent weeks deliberating with Robert Kraft. Rowland announced at a press conference that he was officially "a New York Jets fan, now and probably forever". In 1999, the team officially announced that it would remain in Foxborough, which led to Gillette Stadium's construction. After the Hartford proposal fell through, Robert Kraft paid for 100% of the construction costs, a rare instance of an NFL owner privately financing the construction of a stadium.

Design 
On April 18, 2000, the team revealed plans for the new stadium in Foxborough. It was announced as a 68,000-seat stadium at a cost of $325 million, with the entire cost privately funded. Boston is thus the only city in professional sports in which all facilities are privately owned and operated. The Kraft Group (owner of the NFL team the Patriots and the MLS team the Revolution) owns Gillette Stadium, the Red Sox own Fenway Park, and TD Garden is owned by Delaware North (the owner of the Bruins) (the Celtics rent the TD Garden from Delaware North).

Concurrently announced was a new road to access the stadium from U.S. Route 1, and an additional 3,000 parking spaces to accommodate the increased number of fans.

The stadium was designed by HOK Sport (now Populous). Kraft wanted it modeled on M&T Bank Stadium which had opened in Baltimore in 1998. Kraft insisted on it having a "front door" with a Disneyland-like entrance. Populous went through 200 designs before coming up with one that Kraft liked. The lighthouse and bridge are now featured on the stadium's logo.

For the first eight years of its existence the stadium used a video display, with a smaller LED scoreboard just beneath it, at each end of the field. The south side also had a large LED scoreboard in addition to the smaller one. In 2010, the stadium installed two new HD Daktronics video displays to replace the entire previous setup at both ends. At the time of their construction, the larger screen, at 41.5 feet tall and 164 feet wide (12.6 m x 50.0 m), was the second-largest video monitor in any NFL stadium; only AT&T Stadium had a larger one.

Gillette Stadium ranks first among all NFL venues in stadium food safety with a 0% critical violations. The Gillette Stadium food service, instead of being outsourced like most NFL teams, is run in-house and is led by the Patriots executive director of foods and beverage David Wheeler.

Marking the 20th anniversary of the September 11 attacks, a memorial garden was installed outside Gillette Stadium. It has a semicircle of six flowering trees, a commemorative plaque, a mural and tribute stones with the names of the victims.

2022 renovation project

On December 10, 2021, a $225 million renovation project was announced. Construction began in January 2022 and is set to be completed prior to the 2023 NFL season. The renovations include a new 22,000 square-foot outdoor video board to be installed at the north end, the largest video board of its kind in the United States. A new lighthouse, which will tower 218 feet into the sky, will provide 360-degree views of the stadium, Patriot Place, the town of Foxborough, and beyond. 75,000 square feet of hospitality and function spaces will be constructed to connect the East and West Putnam Clubs, the Dell Technology Suite Levels, and the upper concourse. The construction of these new spaces will connect all levels 360 degrees. A new plaza and fan entrance will also be built on the north end.

Events

NFL 

The venue has hosted the NFL's nationally–televised primetime season–opening games in 2002, 2004, 2005, 2015, 2017, and 2019 (when the Patriots unveiled their championship banners from Super Bowls XXXVI, XXXVIII, XXXIX, XLIX, LI, and LIII. The first ever NFL game at the stadium was held on September 9, 2002 against the Pittsburgh Steelers, a 30-14 Patriots victory. The stadium's first playoff game was held the next year following the 2003 regular season. Playing in the Divisional Round against the Tennessee Titans, the Patriots hosted the coldest game (wind chill) in New England Patriots history. The Patriots won 17–14. The stadium also played host to the 2003 AFC Championship Game, in which the Patriots defeated the Indianapolis Colts 24–14.

The Patriots won the first seven playoff games held at the stadium between the 2003 and 2007 seasons, including the 2007 AFC Championship Game, where they beat the San Diego Chargers to improve to 18-0 and advance to Super Bowl XLII. On January 10, 2010, the Baltimore Ravens beat the Patriots 33–14, giving the Patriots their first home loss in the playoffs in Gillette Stadium. The Patriots suffered their second consecutive home playoff loss on January 16, 2011 in a 28–21 New York Jets victory. During the 2011-12 NFL playoffs, the Patriots defeated the Denver Broncos, 45–10, and the stadium hosted its third AFC Championship, where they won against the Baltimore Ravens, 23–20. However, the New York Giants ruined the Patriots' season by beating them in the Super Bowl for the second time. The following year, they again hosted the AFC Championship game, where they lost 28–13 to the Baltimore Ravens in the final game for long term Patriots radio announcer Gil Santos. During the Divisional Round of the 2014-15 NFL playoffs, the Patriots avenged their 2012 defeat by the Baltimore Ravens by beating them 35–31.  The following week, they defeated the Indianapolis Colts 45–7 in the 2014 AFC Championship. The stadium hosted its sixth AFC Championship game during the 2016 playoffs, as the Patriots defeated 

the Pittsburgh Steelers 36–17. The seventh AFC Championship hosted at Gillette Stadium came the next year, when the Patriots knocked off the Jacksonville Jaguars by a score of 24–20. In the 2018 season, Gillette Stadium hosted a Divisional Round game, as the Patriots knocked off the Los Angeles Chargers by a score of 41–28 on the way to winning Super Bowl LIII. In Tom Brady's final game as a Patriot, were upset by the Tennessee Titans in the First Round of the 2019 playoffs with a loss of 20–13. Entering the 2021 season, the Patriots had an all time playoff record of 19-4 at the stadium.

College football 
As part of the UMass football program's move to Division I FBS, the Minutemen played all of their home games at Gillette Stadium for the 2012 and 2013 seasons. The stadium is 95 miles away from the UMass campus in Amherst—the longest trip of any FBS member. The Minutemen's on-campus stadium, Warren McGuirk Alumni Stadium, was not suitable for FBS football in its previous configuration. Its small size (17,000 seats) would have made it prohibitively difficult to meet FBS average attendance requirements, and its press box and replay facilities were well below Mid-American Conference standards. Additionally, several nonconference teams would not even consider playing games in Amherst. McGuirk Stadium was renovated to FBS standards for the 2014 season, but the Minutemen's current deal with the Kraft Group calls for the Minutemen to play four of their home games in Foxborough from 2014 to 2016 in exchange for keeping part of the revenue from ticket sales. Moving forward, Gillette will continue to host UMass football with those games of anticipated larger attendance.

Ice hockey
Gillette Stadium also hosted the eighth edition of the NHL Winter Classic, between the Boston Bruins and Montreal Canadiens, on January 1, 2016.

Notable soccer games 
Memorable Major League Soccer playoff victories include wins over the Chicago Fire in the 2005 and 2007 Eastern Conference Final, sending the Revs to the MLS Cup. Additionally, the venue hosted MLS Cup 2002, four games of the 2003 FIFA Women's World Cup, and some Copa America Centenario matches in 2016.

The crowd of 61,316 drawn to the 2002 MLS Cup Final was the largest stand-alone MLS post-season crowd on record until the 2018 MLS Cup in Atlanta at Mercedes-Benz Stadium.

MLS Cup

International soccer matches

2026 FIFA World Cup
Gillette Stadium will host multiple matches during the 2026 FIFA World Cup. It is one of eleven US venues selected to host matches during the tournament. During the event, the stadium will be temporarily renamed to "Boston Stadium" in accordance with FIFA's policy on corporate sponsored names.

Lacrosse
Gillette Stadium hosted the NCAA Men's Lacrosse Championships in 2008, 2009, 2012, 2017, and 2018 and was the home of the Boston Cannons for the 2015 season.

Collegiate

Major League Lacrosse 
Source:

Premier Lacrosse League
On February 15, 2019, the Premier Lacrosse League announced that Boston would be the first city on the schedule for the 2019 season. It was also announced that Gillette Stadium would be the venue to host the league on June 1 and 2. The PLL was planning on returning to Gillette for the 2020 season, but the COVID-19 pandemic put the season on pause and the league scrapped their 2020 schedule.

Women's Professional Lacrosse League
On June 2, 2019, Gillette will host a handful of games for the Women's Professional Lacrosse League to start their 2019 season.

Concerts

Other events 
The AMA Supercross Championship has been racing at Gillette Stadium since 2016.

Monster Jam has been coming to the stadium since 2014.

Playing surface 
On November 14, 2006, two days after a rainstorm contributed to the deterioration of the grass surface in a Patriots game against the Jets, team management decided to replace the natural grass surface with a synthetic surface, FieldTurf.  Normally, NFL rules insist that such work could only be done during the off-season; however, the grass field was in such poor condition, the league agreed to waive the rule.  The entire job was done during a two-week road trip, with three shifts working around the clock.  The Patriots' first game on the surface was a victory over the previously 9–1 Chicago Bears on November 26. Brady and his teammates commended the much-improved surface.  At the conclusion of the 2007 season, Patriots quarterback Tom Brady had a career record of 31–3 on artificial turf. The team lost a preseason matchup in August 2007 to the Tennessee Titans on the new FieldTurf but otherwise won its first eleven regular-season and playoff games on the surface covering the period of November 2006 until September 2008, when the Patriots lost to the Miami Dolphins.

In February 2010, the surface was pulled and upgraded to FieldTurf "Duraspine Pro", which was expected to meet FIFA standards that the previous turf did not, preventing the team from having to place sod on top of their turf to host international soccer matches.

The surface was upgraded again in April 2014 to FieldTurf "Revolution" with "VersaTile" drainage system. The FieldTurf Revolution product is currently used at many venues across North America, including Lumen Field (home to the NFL's Seattle Seahawks and MLS's Seattle Sounders) and Providence Park, home of the MLS's Portland Timbers, where its installation was recently completed.

Field logo 
When the field is configured for American football, the Patriots have their "Flying Elvis" logo (or "Pat Patriot" if they are wearing throwback uniforms) painted on the field at dead center of the 50-yard line. Off to both sides along the 50-yard line, the Gillette Stadium logo is also painted on the field. This is a gray-and-blue stylized representation of the bridge and tower at the north entrance of the stadium.

Patriot Place 

In 2006, the Patriots and Kraft announced plans to build a "super regional lifestyle and entertainment center" in the area around Gillette Stadium named Patriot Place.

The first phase of the project opened in fall of 2007, and featured the first Bass Pro Shops in New England, as well as Circuit City (now closed), Bed Bath & Beyond, Five Guys Burgers, Christmas Tree Shops, and Staples. In December 2007, the Patriots and CBS announced plans to build a themed restaurant and nightclub, named "CBS Scene", at the site, which would also include studios for CBS-owned WBZ-TV. The restaurant was part of the second phase of the project, which included an open mall, a health center, a Cinema de Lux movie theater, a four-star Renaissance hotel, and "The Hall at Patriot Place." Attached to Gillette Stadium, the Hall includes a two-level interactive museum honoring the Patriots accomplishments and Super Bowl championships, plus the Patriots Pro Shop. The first restaurants and stores in phase two began opening in July 2008, and were followed by the openings of the Hall at Patriot Place and the CBS Scene in time for the beginning of the 2008 New England Patriots season. More locations, including the health center and hotel, opened in 2009, along with additional sites in phase one.

COVID-19 vaccine mass distribution site 

From January 18, 2021 to June 14, 2021, Gillette Stadium was used as a mass distribution site for the COVID-19 vaccine, with a total of  610,283 shots being administered.

See also
 List of NCAA Division I FBS football stadiums

References

Sources

External links 

 
 Official Patriot Place Website

2003 FIFA Women's World Cup stadiums
National Football League venues
Former Major League Lacrosse venues
American football venues in Massachusetts
Ice hockey venues in Massachusetts
Major League Soccer stadiums
Soccer venues in Massachusetts
New England Patriots stadiums
College lacrosse venues in the United States
Lacrosse venues in Massachusetts
Premier Lacrosse League venues
New England Revolution
Boston Cannons venues
NCAA Men's Division I Lacrosse Championship venues
Tourist attractions in Norfolk County, Massachusetts
Sports in Foxborough, Massachusetts
UMass Minutemen football
College football venues
High school football venues in the United States
2002 establishments in Massachusetts
Sports venues completed in 2002
Buildings and structures in Foxborough, Massachusetts
CONCACAF Gold Cup stadiums
2026 FIFA World Cup Stadiums